Tobias Schlauderer (born 12 February 1984 in Regensburg) is a  German former footballer.

References

External links 
 

1984 births
Living people
Sportspeople from Regensburg
German footballers
Association football midfielders
3. Liga players
1. FC Nürnberg II players
FC Ingolstadt 04 players
SSV Jahn Regensburg players
Footballers from Bavaria